Eugene Allen Booker, Jr. (born December 19, 1962), known professionally as Chuckii Booker, is an American producer, singer, songwriter, multi-instrumentalist and bandleader.

Biography
Booker emerged in the late 1980s as a prominent urban contemporary R&B artist and producer. He began recording music after being signed by his godfather, Barry White, to his production company in 1984. Later, he played keyboards with the short-lived Epic Records band Tease for three years.

Booker received his recording contract in an unlikely manner. He gave his demo tape to the manager of Gerald Albright to showcase his skills as a musician, but had forgotten about the songs on the other side of the tape that contained original songs with his vocals. As a result, he was offered a recording contract with Atlantic Records.

Booker signed a recording contract with Atlantic to release his debut album Chuckii in 1989 in which he played all the instruments and sang all vocals. The album fared well on the strength of hit singles "(Don't U Know) I Love U" and the #1 R&B single "Turned Away". The follow-up final album Niice 'N Wiild was released in 1992 and yielded another chart-topping R&B hit "Games".

Booker produced for several recording artists throughout the years, including Troop, which yielded two #1 singles ("All I Do Is Think of You" & "Spread My Wings"), his godfather Barry White, Janet Jackson, Vanessa Williams, Kool & the Gang and many more. He was the musical director, producer and keyboardist for Janet Jackson's Rhythm Nation World Tour as well as the opening act. Booker got the gig after he was invited by Jackson to the premiere of her long-form video Janet Jackson's Rhythm Nation 1814. Although Booker went to the premiere to mingle with celebrities, he was caught off guard when Jackson asked him after the screening to be her musical director for the tour.

Booker has carved a sizeable niche for himself as a record producer for artists such as Lalah Hathaway, Troop, En Vogue, Angela Winbush, Diana Ross, Anastacia, Commissioned, Rihanna, Lionel Richie, Stevie Wonder, and Bette Midler.

Discography

Albums
Tease (as keyboardist and songwriter):
 1986: Tease (Epic)

As solo artist:

Singles

References

External links

Living people
African-American songwriters
American male singer-songwriters
Record producers from California
1962 births
Singer-songwriters from California
American contemporary R&B singers
21st-century African-American people
20th-century African-American people